Hydroxymatairesinol (HMR) is a lignan found in Norway spruce (Picea abies). It is an enterolactone precursor with anticancer activities. In rats, HMR decreased the volume of induced tumours and stabilised established tumours, as well as preventing the development of new tumours. It has also shown anti-oxidant properties in vitro.

HMR's chemical structure is similar to matairesinol. At high concentrations, HMR has estrogenic properties, which are considerably weaker than those of estradiol.

References

Lignans
Methoxy compounds
Furanones